Ukko Iisakki Peltonen (born 15 June 1998) is a Finnish racing cyclist, who currently rides for UCI Continental team .

Major results
2018
 2nd Time trial, National Under-23 Road Championships
2019
 1st  Time trial, National Road Championships
 1st  Time trial, National Under-23 Road Championships
2020
 National Road Championships
1st  Time trial
2nd Road race
2021
 National Road Championships
2nd Road race
2nd Time trial
 8th Overall Dookoła Mazowsza

References

External links

1998 births
Living people
Finnish male cyclists
Sportspeople from Helsinki